The 1873–74 season was the first season of competitive football by 3rd Lanark RV.

Overview

As one of the eight founder members of the Scottish FA, 3rd Lanark RV took part in the inaugural Scottish Cup. Subscription fees from 15 of the 16 clubs that entered the competition were used to pay for the trophy for which they compete.

The team reached the quarter-finals without playing a match after first round opponents Southern withdrew. However, 3rd Lanark RV were defeated by eventual finalists Clydesdale after a second replay.

During the club's early years, the team would play in red shirts and blue shorts. Their traditional white shorts weren't introduced until 1876.

Results

Scottish Cup

Friendlies

References

1873–74
Third Lanark
1873–74 in Scottish football